Libertad is a 2021 Spanish-Belgian coming-of-age drama film directed and written by Clara Roquet which stars María Morera and Nicolle García, also featuring Nora Navas, Carol Hurtado and Vicky Peña.

Plot 
A coming-of-age story portraying class struggle from the point of view of the privileged class, the fiction follows the friendship between Nora (a rich privileged girl) and Libertad (the daughter of Rosana, the family's Colombian domestic worker), as the former spends the holidays at her grandmother Ángela's summerhouse in the Costa Brava.

Cast

Production 
Libertad (Clara Roquet's debut feature film) is a joint Spain–Belgium co-production and it was produced by Lastor Media and Avalon P.C. alongside Bulletproof Cupid with support from MEDIA, ICAA, ICEC, Eurimages, RTVE, TV3, Movistar+ and Catalan Films.

Filmed in Catalonia in the Summer of 2019, shooting locations included Barcelona, Blanes, Garraf, Lloret de Mar and Sant Andreu de Llavaneres.

Release 
The film had its world premiere at the Cannes' 60th International Critics' Week on 8 July 2021. It also screened as the opening film of the 66th Valladolid International Film Festival (Seminci) on 23 October 2021. Co-distributed by Avalon and Elastica, it was theatrically released in Spain on 19 November 2021.

Reception 
Eulàlia Iglesias of Fotogramas gave Libertad 4 out of 5 stars, deeming it to be "a debut film that brings to the surface with remarkable subtlety an everyday inequality". She highlighted María Morera and Nicolle García, whereas she negatively pointed out that the choice of characters exclusively speaking Spanish felt forced.

Beatriz Martínez of El Periódico de Catalunya gave the film 4 out of 5 stars, presenting it as "a perfectly woven story about class differences, inequalities, mother-son relationships, teen friendship and the youthful yearning to discover the world".

Philippe Engel of Cinemanía gave it 4½ out of 5 stars, considering that Roquet "constructs a prodigious visual and sound montage".

Anton Merikaetxebarria of El Correo gave the film 2 out of 3 stars, considering that the director resolves the underlying coming-of-age story with the required "sensitivity and good taste".

Reviewing for Mondo Sonoro, J. Picatoste Verdejo, gave it 8 out of 10 points; they presented Libertad as a film about oblique affections, considering however that the entanglement of unrequited affections laid out in the plot is presented in a measured balance.

Wendy Ide of ScreenDaily wrote that Roquet's "filmmaking is light of touch and instinctively perceptive, honing in on the tiny details which are magnified through the lens of adolescence", likening her craft to that of Céline Sciamma and Lucrecia Martel.

Accolades 

|-
| align ="center" rowspan ="29" | 2022 || rowspan ="4"| 9th Feroz Awards || colspan ="2" | Best Drama Film ||  || rowspan="4" | 
|-
| Best Director || Clara Roquet  || 
|-
| Best Screenplay || Clara Roquet || 
|-
| Best Film Poster || Jordi Trilla || 
|-
| rowspan = "5" | 77th CEC Medals || colspan = "2" | Best Film ||  || rowspan = "5" | 
|-
| Best New Director || Clara Roquet || 
|-
| Best Supporting Actress || Nora Navas || 
|-
| Best New Actress || Nicolle García || 
|-
| Best Cinematography || Gris Jordana || 
|-
|  rowspan ="6"| 36th Goya Awards || colspan ="2" | Best Film ||  || rowspan="6" | 
|-
| Best New Director || Clara Roquet  || 
|-
| Best Original Screenplay || Clara Roquet || 
|-
| Best Supporting Actress || Nora Navas || 
|-
| Best New Actress || Nicolle García || 
|-
| Best Cinematography || Gris Jordana || 
|-
| rowspan = "12" | 14th Gaudí Awards || colspan = "2" | Best Non-Catalan Language Film ||  || rowspan = "12" | 
|-
| Best Director || Clara Roquet || 
|-
| Best Screenplay || Cara Roquet || 
|-
| Best Actress || Maria Morera || 
|-
| Best Art Direction || Marta Bazaco || 
|-
| Best Editing || Ana Pfaff || 
|-
| rowspan = "2" | Best Supporting Actress || Nora Navas || 
|-
| Vicky Peña || 
|-
| Best Original Music || Paul Tyan || 
|-
| Best Cinematography || Gris Jordana || 
|-
| Best Makeup and Hairstyles || Barbara Broucke, Jesús Martos || 
|-
| colspan = "2" | Public's Choice Special Award for Best Film || 
|-
| Spanish Screenwriters' Union Awards || Best Screenplay in a Drama Feature Film || Clara Roquet ||  || 
|-
| 9th Platino Awards || Best Ibero-American Debut Feature Film || Clara Roquet ||  || 
|}

See also 
 List of Spanish films of 2021
 List of films that depict class struggle

References

External links 
 Libertad at ICAA's Catálogo de Cinespañol

2021 films
2021 drama films
2020s Spanish-language films
2020s coming-of-age drama films
Spanish coming-of-age drama films
Belgian coming-of-age drama films
Films about social class
Domestic workers in films
Films set in Catalonia
Films set in the Mediterranean Sea
Avalon films
Films shot in the province of Barcelona
Films shot in the province of Girona
2020s Spanish films
2021 directorial debut films